A Song for a New Day is a science fiction novel by American writer Sarah Pinsker, first published in trade paperback and ebook by Berkley Books in September 2019. The first British edition was issued in hardcover and ebook by Ad Astra/Head of Zeus in August 2020.

Summary
The novel follows the life of a musician in a future where pandemics and terrorism make public events, such as concerts, illegal.

Reception
Kirkus Reviews called A Song for a New Day "a gorgeous novel that celebrates what can happen when one person raises her voice," while Publishers Weekly gave the book a starred review and said "this tale of hope and passion is a remarkable achievement."

Awards
A Song for a New Day won the 2020 Nebula Award for Best Novel, was a finalist for the 2020 Locus Poll Award for Best Novel, and was nominated for the 2020 Compton Crook Award for Best First Novel.

References

2019 science fiction novels
Works by Sarah Pinsker
Nebula Award for Best Novel-winning works
Berkley Books books
Head of Zeus books